The following is a list of rosters of the former UCI team Mitsubishi–Jartazi, categorised by season.

2004
Roster in 2004, age as of 1 January 2004:

2005
Roster in 2005, age as of 1 January 2005:

2006
Roster in 2006, age as of 1 January 2006:

2007
Roster in 2007, age as of 1 January 2007:

2008
Roster in 2008, age as of 1 January 2008:

References

Lists of cyclists by team